Moukhtar Hussain El-Gamal (born 5 August 1935) is an Egyptian water polo player. He competed at the 1960 Summer Olympics and the 1964 Summer Olympics.

References

1935 births
Living people
Egyptian male water polo players
Olympic water polo players of Egypt
Water polo players at the 1960 Summer Olympics
Water polo players at the 1964 Summer Olympics
Sportspeople from Cairo
20th-century Egyptian people